Peter III was a cat who served as the Chief Mouser to the Cabinet Office from August 1947 to March 1964.

History 
Peter III became Chief Mouser in August 1947, following the death of Peter II, who had been hit by a car.

Peter III attracted the widespread public attention following an appearance on the BBC in 1958. This public affection appears to have spread to outside the UK, with Peter having a large 'fanbase' in both Italy and the United States.

He remained as Chief Mouser until March 1964, serving under five Prime Ministers (Attlee, Churchill, Eden, Macmillan and Douglas-Home). He was euthanised on 9 March 1964, after suffering from a liver infection, and replaced by Peta. He was buried in April 1964.

See also
 List of individual cats

References 

1964 animal deaths
Individual cats in England
Individual cats in politics
Working cats
Chief Mousers to the Cabinet Office
Animal deaths by euthanasia